Tom Mix Wash is a stream in Pinal County, Arizona, in the United States. The wash was named for Tom Mix, an American actor who was killed in a road accident in 1940 near this spot.

See also
 List of rivers of Arizona

References

Rivers of Pinal County, Arizona
Washes of Arizona